Maria Bartusz (born 28 September 1987) is a Polish para badminton player who competes in international level events.

Achievements

World Championships 

Women's singles

Women's doubles

European Championships 
Women's singles

Mixed doubles

References

Notes 

1987 births
Living people
Sportspeople from Opole
Polish female badminton players
Polish para-badminton players